is a former Japanese football player.

Club statistics

References

External links

j-league

1991 births
Living people
Association football people from Ehime Prefecture
Japanese footballers
J2 League players
Ehime FC players
Association football forwards